The Philadelphia Sphas were an early American professional basketball team. The 1933-34 season was the first played in the American Basketball League by the Sphas, although they did play in the ABL from 1926-1928 as the Philadelphia Warriors, no relation to the later BAA franchise. The Sphas played in leagues around Philadelphia since 1917, but game-by-game records before the Sphas rejoined the ABL in 1933 are not available. After finishing a perfect 14-0 in the second part of the season, the Sphas would win the league championship with a 4-2 series victory over the Trenton Moose. The Sphas were also referred to as the Philadelphia Hebrews in league records during this time.

Notes
 Became the Camden Brewers after losing first 4 games 
 Game played in Brooklyn

References

Philadelphia Sphas seasons